Thomas Heights is a line of summit ridges that extend from Bettle Peak Eastward to the Scott Coast, Victoria Land. The feature forms a portion of the divide between the lower ends of Ferrar Glacier and Blue Glacier. Named by the New Zealand Antarctic Place-Names Committee (NZ-APC) in 1983 after Arthur A. Thomas of New Zealand at the suggestion of Robert Findlay, New Zealand Antarctic Research Program (NZARP) geologist to the area, 1977–1981.

Ridges of Victoria Land
Scott Coast